Bhavya Bishnoi (born 16 February 1993) is an Indian politician from the Bharatiya Janata Party. He was elected to the Haryana Legislative Assembly for the Adampur, Haryana Assembly constituency in a November 2022 by-election. He is the youngest legislator in the state.

Sports 
Bishnoi played for Oxford University Cricket Club.

Family 
Bishnoi is the son of politicians Kuldeep Bishnoi and Renuka Bishnoi.

References 

1993 births
Living people
Bharatiya Janata Party politicians
21st-century Indian politicians
Haryana MLAs 2019–2024

Indian cricketers
Oxford University cricketers
Alumni of St Antony's College, Oxford
Indian sportsperson-politicians